The Kalama River is a  tributary of the Columbia River, in the U.S. state of Washington. It flows entirely within Cowlitz County, Washington. Calama River is an old variant name.

Gabriel Franchere in 1811 wrote of the Indian village at the mouth of the Kalama River, adding that it was called Thlakalamah.

Course
The Kalama River originates in the Cascade Range just south of Mount St. Helens.

See also
List of rivers of Washington
Tributaries of the Columbia River

References

Rivers of Cowlitz County, Washington
Rivers of Washington (state)
Tributaries of the Columbia River